William Stewart (1737 – 8 October 1797), of Castle Stewart, was a Scottish MP in the British Parliament. He was a member of a junior branch of the family of the Earl of Galloway, being the first son of John Stewart of Castle Stewart.

Stewart was educated at Glasgow University. He was an officer in the 60th Regiment of Foot during the Seven Years' War, leaving the army in 1769 as a Captain.

He represented Wigtown Burghs from 7 May 1770 – 1774 and Kirkcudbright Stewartry in 1774–1780.

References
History of Parliament: House of Commons 1754-1790, by Sir Lewis Namier and James Brooke (Sidgwick & Jackson 1964)

1737 births
1797 deaths
Members of the Parliament of Great Britain for Scottish constituencies
British Army personnel of the Seven Years' War
Royal American Regiment officers
Alumni of the University of Glasgow
Politics of Dumfries and Galloway
Scottish soldiers
British MPs 1768–1774
British MPs 1774–1780